The La Costa xeric shrublands (NT1309) is an ecoregion in Venezuela that stretches along the Caribbean coast.
The dry scrub and savanna has been subject to modification since the 16th century by European colonists who replaced it by a patchwork of farm fields and pasturage. 
Little of the original habitat remains.

Geography

Location
The La Costa xeric shrublands ecoregion extends along Venezuela's Caribbean coast, covering plains, hills and isolated mountains.
Caracas, the capital of Venezuela, lies partly in this ecoregion.
It reaches from Sucre state in the east to Yaracuy state in the west.
The ecoregion includes areas of savanna, dry forest, moist forest, swamp and scrub.

In the west the shrubland transitions into the Lara-Falcón dry forests ecoregion.
The extreme west of the La Costa xeric shrublands merges into the Paraguana xeric scrub just east of Barquisimeto.
To the south the La Costa xeric shrublands transitions into the Llanos. 
There are regions of Cordillera de la Costa montane forests along the Caribbean coastline. 
The coastal area in the east of the region is covered by Araya and Paria xeric scrub.
In the extreme east the ecoregion transitions into Orinoco Delta swamp forests.

Terrain

The xeric shrublands are in the Coastal Cordillera geographical region.
The shrublands, which blend into the Llanos grasslands to the south, surround the mountains of the Venezuelan Coastal Range.
Along the coast there are sandy beaches, mangroves, lagoons and hilly patches of moist forest.

Climate

At a sample location at coordinates  the Köppen climate classification is "Aw": equatorial, winter dry.

Ecology

The ecoregion is in the neotropical realm, in the deserts and xeric shrublands biome.

Flora

Species in the dense thorn forest include Bourreria cumanensis, Caesalpinia coriaria, Caesalpinia vesicaria, Cereus hexagonus, Chloroleucon mangense, Coccoloba ramosissima, Cynophalla hastata, Parkinsonia praecox, Pereskia guamacho, Piptadenia flava, Prosopis juliflora, Vachellia macracantha, Vachellia tortuosa, Xylosoma benthamii and species from the Erythroxylum, Jacquinia and Mimosa genera.

There are savannas with tall grasses, shrubs and palms throughout the region, with plants such as Axonopus aureus, Borreria aristeguietana, Bowdichia virgilioides, Byrsonima crassifolia,  Casearia sylvestris, Cochlospermum vitifolium, Copaifera officinalis, Curatella americana, Godmania aesculifolia, Leptocoryphium lanatum, Polycarpaea corymbosa, Stilpnopappus pittieri, Trachypogon plumosus, Vochysia venezolana and species of the Andropogon, Bulbostylis, Panicum and  Rhynchospora genera.
The west of the region has herbaceous savannas that include Axonopus canescens, Bowdichia virgilioides, Curatella americana, Leptocoryphium lanatum, Trachypogon plumus and Paspalum species.
Borreria aristeguietana and Stilpnopappus pittieri are endemic to the ecoregion.

Fauna

Endemic mammals found in this and other dry forest ecoregions in Colombia and Venezuela include the Guajira mouse opossum (Marmosa xerophila) and Hummelinck's vesper mouse (Calomys hummelincki).
Endemic birds include the yellow-shouldered amazon (Amazona barbadensis), Maracaibo tody-flycatcher (Todirostrum viridanum), pygmy palm swift (Tachornis furcata), buffy hummingbird (Leucippus fallax), chestnut piculet (Picumnus cinnamomeus), white-whiskered spinetail (Synallaxis candei), black-backed antshrike (Thamnophilus melanonotus), slender-billed inezia (Inezia tenuirostris), Tocuyo sparrow (Arremonops tocuyensis) and vermilion cardinal (Cardinalis phoeniceus).
Endangered birds include the rusty-flanked crake (Laterallus levraudi), plain-flanked rail (Rallus wetmorei) and red siskin (Spinus cucullatus).

Status

The World Wildlife Fund gives the ecoregion the status of "Critical/Endangered".
There is a large human population that dates back to 16th century colonists from Europe.
Most of the natural habitat has been destroyed, particularly in the lower areas, replaced by a patchwork of towns, farm fields and pastures.
A few areas of natural savanna and thorn forest remain.
The El Ávila National Park and San Esteban National Park hold small areas of xeric shrubland.
Other protected areas include the Mochima National Park and the Henri Pittier National Park.

Notes

Sources

Neotropical ecoregions
Ecoregions of Venezuela
Deserts and xeric shrublands